Mathews Theodosius (born 4 May 1959) is a Syriac Orthodox bishop, serving as Metropolitan of Kollam diocese.

References

Syriac Orthodox Church bishops
1959 births
Living people
People from Pathanamthitta